Antioch is an unincorporated community in Claiborne Parish, Louisiana, United States.

Notes

Unincorporated communities in Claiborne Parish, Louisiana
Unincorporated communities in Louisiana